David Alan "Ted" Turner (born 2 August 1950) is an English guitarist and vocalist best known for his work with the 1970s rock band Wishbone Ash, in which he was famed for his twin lead guitar instrumental arrangements with Andy Powell. Turner also contributed lap steel guitar to a variety of Wishbone Ash recordings.

Career

Pre-Wishbone Ash
Prior to Wishbone Ash, Turner played with the Birmingham band, King Biscuit.

Wishbone Ash
Turner joined Wishbone Ash in 1969. Extensive touring followed, whilst also recording “Wishbone Ash”, “Pilgrimage”, and the acclaimed “Argus”, winning best album of the year in 1972. Ted left the band after their fourth album, Wishbone Four, in 1974.

His main guitar during this period was a Gibson Les Paul. He also used a Fender Stratocaster and vintage lap steel guitars. Wishbone Ash also used the early Orange/Matamp amplifiers during this period.

In 1971, Turner was invited to play on John Lennon's Imagine, on "Crippled Inside" and "How Do You Sleep", playing acoustic guitar on both tracks, with Crippled Inside being used on the album. Other sessions included artists Cilla Black, George Harrison , Al Stewart.

Post-Wishbone Ash
In the spring of 1974, Ted left Wishbone Ash and the music business to travel the world. By 1975 he had found his way to New Orleans and into the 'World Man Band' project, an attempt to raise global consciousness through rock music based upon information from R. Buckminster Fuller working with Michael Mitchell. 
Later that same year, Turner moved to Los Angeles to write record music with a friend Tom Gebr.

In 1980, Turner returned to England and did studio work with Stewart Copeland, Gene October, and Brian James. The next year found him once again in the United States, where he married and formed a new band. Called "Choice", it featured Greg Cook (guitars, keyboards, and vocals), Robbie Hewlett (bass guitar) and Bobby Dean Wickland (drums). In 1982, Ted joined Joey Molland's Badfinger and toured the country with them.

From 1983 to 1985, Turner was involved in various recording projects. In 1985 he moved to Chicago, recorded with various artistes including Sugar Blue a blues harmonica player used by The Rolling Stones on their hit song “Miss You”.

Rejoining Wishbone Ash
In 1987 he rejoined Wishbone Ash and with them recorded "Nouveau Calls" for Miles Copeland III's No Speak label. In the spring of 1988, the original Wishbone Ash toured England and Europe for the first time in 15 years, and in the autumn of that year Turner and Andy Powell were invited to join Copeland's "Night of the Guitar" tour. That group included such guitar legends as Randy California, Peter Haycock, Steve Howe, Steve Hunter, Robby Krieger, Leslie West, Alvin Lee and Jan Akkerman.

Later work
Turner continued to tour and record with Wishbone Ash recording “Here to Hear” in 1989, “Strange Affair”in 1991, and “Live in Chicago” in 1992, until 1994 when he once again decided to depart. In that same year, he suffered – and witnessed – the loss of his son Kipp, who was killed by a drunk driver in Scottsdale, Arizona. He now has a daughter Sloane. He has also made guest appearances with Martin Turner's band. Martin Turner (no relation) was also a founding original member of Wishbone Ash, bassist/vocalist. This included a performance at the High Voltage Festival in London's Victoria Park in July 2010. Other festival appearances in Japan and Mexico. Also an appearance with Andy Powell’s band at Ashcon.

In February 2014 Ted married Majella. A gifted singer-songwriter, and in the spring of 2018 released their first musical collaboration “Better Together” receiving international acclaim and the birth of a new musical genre “New Age Soul”. The album was nominated for “best album of the year 2018” by Get Ready To Rock Radio, one of the major U.K. stations.
A second album “Divine Timing” was released 21 December 2021 adding to their increasing popularity.

Recognition
He has been voted one of Rolling Stone'''s 'Top Twenty Rock Guitarists of All Time', and named by Traffic'' magazine as "one of the most important guitarists in rock history".

References

External links
 
 Official Website of the Band Wishbone Ash.
 'Martin Turner's Wishbone Ash' official site.
  official site.

1950 births
Living people
Lead guitarists
Slide guitarists
English rock guitarists
Wishbone Ash members
Musicians from Birmingham, West Midlands